Tokobot, later released in Japan as , is a puzzle-platform game developed and published by Tecmo for the PlayStation Portable in 2005.

Plot
The game revolves around Bolt, an agent from Canewood's Lab. His first research expedition leads him to discover rare Karakuri robots known as Tokobots, one of which is Zero, a prototype gigantic, planet-destroying robot programmed for evil. Bolt must discover the secrets of the ruins, find Zero, and destroy it before it can destroy his world.

There are three human villains in the game who own robots and battle Bolt with large Karakuri robots: Flames, Bart, and Colonel Fuel (in order of appearance).

Gameplay
The player controls Bolt, who makes use of the Tokobots to explore the prehistoric ruins found in the game. The Tokobots mimic Bolt's actions and can be used together in "joint actions", complex tasks that include fusing them together to make Karakuri combinations. Combinations can do almost anything, from activating dead gears to shooting laser beams.

There are two types of Karakuri robots, both of which come in varying sizes: Workers and Keepers.  Workers do odd jobs and include small Clunkers and the large Tornader. Keepers protect the ancient ruins and include tiny Beepers and the evil Zero.

Versions
The PlayStation 2 version of the game adds secret platforming sections that allow players access to hidden treasures. In addition, players no longer have control over the Overdrive forms; they now only briefly appear to attack before disappearing.

Reception

Tokobot and Tokobot Plus received "average" reviews according to the review aggregation website Metacritic. In Japan, Famitsu gave it a score of three eights and one seven for a total of 31 out of 40 for the PSP version, and 28 out of 40 for the PS2 version.

References

External links
 Official Website (Japan)
 Official Website (North America)
 
 

2005 video games
3D platform games
PlayStation Portable games
PlayStation Network games
PlayStation 2 games
Puzzle video games
Tecmo games
Koei Tecmo franchises
Single-player video games
Video games about robots
Video games developed in Japan